Mohammad Ishaq (born 7 March 1963) is a Pakistani former cricketer who played first-class cricket for Lahore between 1984–85 and 1986–87.

Ishaq was born in Lahore, Punjab, Pakistan.  In his 13 first-class games he made 751 runs at an average of 30.04 and with a high score of 119. He later emigrated to the United Arab Emirates, for whom he played in the 1994 ICC Trophy and Pepsi Austral-Asia Cup and the 1996 World Cup. It was in the last two competitions that Mohammad Ishaq played his five One Day Internationals for UAE and scored 98 runs at an average of 24.50 his highest score was 51. He last played in

External links

1963 births
Living people
Pakistani cricketers
Emirati cricketers
United Arab Emirates One Day International cricketers
Pakistani emigrants to the United Arab Emirates
Pakistani expatriate sportspeople in the United Arab Emirates
Cricketers from Lahore
Lahore City cricketers
Lahore City Whites cricketers
Lahore City Blues cricketers